Madame Ke (c. 1588 – December 1627), was the nanny of the Tianqi Emperor (1605–1627), and known for her great influence during his reign as Emperor of China (Ming dynasty) from 1620 to 1627.

Life
The background of Madame Ke is rather vague and her original full name is Yinyue (印月),  but she was a commoner from Dingxing in Baoding, married to a man named Hou Ba'er (a.k.a. Hou Er; d. c. 1608), and had a son named Hou Guoxing and a brother named Ke Guangxian.

She was employed at the imperial court of the Forbidden city at the age of eighteen, and given the task of nanny or wet nurse to the future Tianqi Emperor after his birth in 1605. He had no contact with his biological mother, Consort Wang (d. 1619), and became completely dependent upon Madame Ke: she was reportedly so close to him that she kept all his baby hair and his nail cuttings in boxes, while he refused to be pacified at mealtime or at bedtime unless she was there.
Madame Ke was described as an "alluring" beauty, and had close relationships with the eunuchs Wei Chao and, more famously, Wei Zhongxian.

Reign of the Tianqi Emperor
When her charge succeeded to the throne as the Tianqi Emperor at the age of fifteen in 1620, he gave Madame Ke the title of "Lady Fengsheng" (Fengsheng furen), gave her son and brother imperial privileges as battalion commanders of the Imperial Bodyguard, and appointed Wei Zhongxian to the prestigious office of eunuch custodian of the Imperial brushes at the Directorate of the Ceremonial. Together, Madame Ke and Wei Zhongxian purged the imperial court of their enemies and took control over state affairs in a de facto rule referred to as "Ke-Wei".

As was the custom, Madame Ke moved out of the personal palace of the emperor when he married in 1621, but the emperor had her move back soon afterward, as he could not bear to be apart from her. Madame Ke came to be involved in a conflict with the empress, who attempted to crush the influence of the Ke-Wei regime by accusing Madame Ke of a number of crimes in public and ordered for her to be caned, but before this punishment could be carried out, it was prevented by the emperor. Reportedly, Madame Ke and Wei Zhongxian kept the emperor childless by inducing miscarriages upon his concubines and consorts, and were also responsible for murdering some of the concubines and consorts on at least two occasions.  Specifically, they were allegedly the actual cause of the 1623 miscarriage of the empress by ordering a palace maid to poison her, and also murdered the concubine Wang and the Consort Li by drowning, after they had uttered complaints about them.

In 1624, the official Yang Liang attempted to oust the "Ke-Wei"-government by presenting charges against Wei Zhongxian, but his party failed, and the following year saw him and his followers being forced to resign and in some cases imprisoned, tortured and killed on the instigation of Madame Ke and Wei Zhongxian.

Death
When the Chongzhen Emperor succeeded his brother to the throne in 1627, Madame Ke was demoted to the Laundry Department, where she was kept under supervision, and Wei Zhongxian to the post of incense handler at the imperial mausoleum; Wei Zhongxian hanged himself, while Madame Ke was beaten to death during interrogation in the laundry in December 1627.

See also
 Lu Lingxuan

References

Ming dynasty people
1580s births
1627 deaths
Year of birth uncertain
Royal favourites
Nannies
Chinese torture victims
Chinese courtiers
Chinese domestic workers
17th-century Chinese people
17th-century Chinese women